The Carlyle is a 300 ft (91m) tall skyscraper at Fourth Avenue and Wood Street in Pittsburgh. It was completed in 1906 and has 21 floors. It is tied with Washington Plaza and the Commonwealth Building for 27th tallest building in the city.

History
This 1906 neo-classical building was originally the Union National Bank Building, designed by the architectural firm of MacClure & Spahr. Benno Janssen, who was employed by that firm, had a key role in its design. Union National Bank later became Integra Bank and vacated the building. After many years of relatively low occupancy rates, the structure was converted into condominiums in 2006.

See also
List of tallest buildings in Pittsburgh

References

External links

Skyscraperpage

Residential skyscrapers in Pittsburgh
Residential condominiums in the United States
Office buildings completed in 1906
1906 establishments in Pennsylvania